Al-Husn (also spelled al-Hisn) is a large village in northwestern Syria, administratively part of the Homs Governorate, located west of Homs and north of the border with Lebanon. Nearby localities include al-Huwash to the east, Anaz to the southeast, Aridah to the south, al-Zarah to the southwest, Zweitina to the west, al-Nasirah and Marmarita to the northwest, Muqlus to the north and Mazinah to the northeast.

According to the Syria Central Bureau of Statistics (CBS), al-Husn had a population of 8,980 in the 2004 census. It is the largest village in the al-Huwash nahiyah ("subdistrict"), which consisted of 19 localities with a collective population of 24,684 in 2004. The inhabitants of the village are predominantly Sunni Muslims, with a Christian minority, in an area largely populated by Christians that is known as Wadi al-Nasara ("Valley of the Christians.") The village has a Greek Catholic Church.

The village is built around the Krak des Chevaliers fortress (known as Hisn al-Akrad in Arabic) and the name al-Husn means "the Castle." The building itself used to be inhabited until its residents were evacuated by the French authorities who wanted to excavate the site. However, those who were dispersed built their homes outside the fortress and later benefited financially from the tourism it generated. The village has since developed with little civic planning, which has resulted in urban sprawl surrounding the fortress. A restaurant called Al-Kala'a Restaurant that is popular with tourists is located on a hill in the village.

In 2014 it was the site of a battle of the Syrian Civil War.

References

Bibliography

 

Populated places in Talkalakh District